Neoascochyta desmazieri is a species of fungi belonging to the family Didymellaceae.

Synonym:
 Ascochyta desmazieri Cavara

The species is named after amateur mycologist John Baptiste Henri Joseph Desmazières.

References

Pleosporales